Vincent Harris was an English architect.

Vincent Harris may also refer to:

Vincent Harris (political strategist), American conservative political strategist
 Vincent Madeley Harris (1913–1988), American Catholic clergyman
Vincent Harris (MP), Member of Parliament (MP) for Maldon